William Charles "Happy" Barnard  (March 3, 1915June 29, 2008) was a professional American football end in the National Football League. He played one season for the New York Giants (1938).

External links

1915 births
2008 deaths
People from Taylor County, Texas
Players of American football from Texas
American football wide receivers
Central Oklahoma Bronchos football players
New York Giants players